Anna Quirentia Nilsson (March 30, 1888 – February 11, 1974) was a Swedish-American actress who achieved success in American silent movies.

Early life
Nilsson was born in Ystad, Sweden in 1888. Her middle name Quirentia is derived from her date of birth, March 30, Saint Quirinius' Day. When she was 8 years old her father, Per Nilsson, got a job at the local sugar factory in Hasslarp, a small community outside Helsingborg in Sweden where she spent most of her school years. She did very well in school, graduating with highest marks. Due to her good grades, she was hired as a sales clerk in Halmstad on the Swedish west coast, unusual for a young woman from a worker's family at the time, but she had set her mind on going to the United States.

In 1905, she emigrated to the United States through Ellis Island. In the U.S., she started working as a nursemaid and learned English quickly.

Career

Silent films

In 1907, Nilsson was named "Most beautiful woman in America". The noted cover artist Penrhyn Stanlaws chose her one of his models, which led her to getting a role in Kalem's 1911 film Molly Pitcher. 

She stayed at the Kalem studio for several years, ranked behind its top star Alice Joyce, then branching out to other production companies. Films of special note are Regeneration (1915) Seven Keys to Baldpate (1917), Soldiers of Fortune (1919), The Toll Gate and The Luck of the Irish (both 1920), and The Lotus Eater (1921). In 1921, while on a rare vacation return to Sweden, she was asked to film Värmlänningarna, her only Swedish movie.

In the 1920s, she freelanced successfully for Paramount, First National and many other studios and reached a peak of popularity just before the advent of talkies. In 1923, she was severely burned while filming a scene in which she drove a locomotive through a forest fire for Hearts Aflame; she required a week to recuperate, but that did not impede her career. That year, she made nine movies, including portraying "Cherry Malotte" in the second movie based upon Rex Beach's The Spoilers, a role that would be played in later versions by Betty Compson (1930), Marlene Dietrich (1942), and Anne Baxter (1955). In 1926, she was named Hollywood's most popular woman. She welcomed royalty when the Swedish Crown Prince Gustav Adolf (later King Gustaf VI Adolf) and his wife Louise Mountbatten visited Hollywood. In 1928, she set a record for fan mail, some 30,000 letters per month, and in that year Joseph P. Kennedy brought her to his newly formed film company RKO Radio Pictures. The following year, as she was horse riding, she fell off the horse, was thrown against a stone wall and broke her hip. After a year of hard training, she was on her feet again. In 1928, Anna Nilsson made her last film of the silent era, Blockade.

Sound films
With the introduction of sound films, Nilsson's career went into a sharp decline, although she continued to play small, often uncredited parts in films into the 1950s. Between 1930 and 1950, she participated in 39 sound films in smaller roles. She played the role of the Swedish immigrant mother of Loretta Young in The Farmer's Daughter (1947). Her best known performance in a sound film is arguably her turn as herself, referred to as one of Swanson's "waxworks" in Sunset Boulevard (1950), where she has one line.

Nilsson has a star on the Hollywood Walk of Fame at 6150 Hollywood Boulevard for her contribution to motion pictures. She was the first Swedish-born actress to receive such an honor.

Personal life
Nilsson was married to actor Guy Coombs from 1916 until 1917 and to Norwegian-American shoe merchant John Marshall Gunnerson from 1922 until 1925. She died in Sun City, California on February 11, 1974, of heart failure.

Nilsson was a Lutheran and a registered Republican who was supportive of Dwight Eisenhower's campaign during the 1952 presidential election.

Selected filmography

 The Express Envelope (1911, Short) as Hazel
 Molly Pitcher (1911, Short) as Molly Pitcher
 The Flash in the Night (1911, Short) as Kate
 The Darling of the C.S.A. (1912)
 The Confederate Ironclad (1912, Short) as Elinor Adams - a Union Spy
 Wolfe; Or, The Conquest of Quebec (1914) as Mignon Mars
 The Hazards of Helen (1914, Serial) as Helen [Ch. 18] 'The Night Operator at Buxton'
 Regeneration (1915) as Marie Deering
 Barbara Frietchie (1915) as Sue Negly
 The Scarlet Road (1916) as Betty Belgrave
 The Supreme Sacrifice (1916) as Helen Chambers
 Her Surrender (1916) as Rhoda Cortlandt
 Infidelity (1917) as Elaine Bernard
 The Moral Code (1917) as Jean Hyland
 The Inevitable (1917) as Florence Grey
 The Silent Master (1917) as Minor Role
 Seven Keys to Baldpate (1917) as Mary Norton
 Over There (1917) as Bettie Adams
 Heart of the Sunset (1918) as Alaire Austin
 The Trail to Yesterday (1918) as Sheila Langford
 No Man's Land (1918) as Katherine Gresham
 In Judgement Of (1918) as Mary Manners
 The Vanity Pool (1918) as Carol Harper
 Ravished Armenia (1919) as Edith Graham
 Venus in the East (1919) as Mrs. Pat Dyvenot
 Cheating Cheaters (1919) as Grace Palmer
 The Way of the Strong (1919) as Audrie Hendrie / Monica Norton
 A Very Good Young Man (1919) as Viva Bacchus
 The Love Burglar (1919) as Joan Gray
 A Sporting Chance (1919) as Pamela Brent
 Her Kingdom of Dreams (1919) as Carlotta Stanmore
 Soldiers of Fortune (1919) as Alice Langham
 The Luck of the Irish (1920) as Ruth Warren
 The Thirteenth Commandment (1920) as Leila Kip
 The Toll Gate (1920) as Mary Brown
 The Figurehead (1920) as Mary Forbes
 One Hour Before Dawn (1920) as Ellen Aldrich
 The Fighting Chance (1920) as Sylvia Landis
 In the Heart of a Fool (1920) as Margaret Muller
 The Brute Master (1920) as Madeline Grey
 What Women Will Do (1921) as Lily Gibbs
 Without Limit (1921) as Ember Edwards
 The Oath (1921) as Irene Lansing
 Why Girls Leave Home (1921) as Anna Hedder
 Värmlänningarna (1921, her only Swedish film) as Anna
 The Lotus Eater (1921) as Madge Vance
 Ten Nights in a Bar Room (1921)
 Three Live Ghosts (1922) as Ivis
 The Man from Home (1922) as Genevieve Granger-Simpson
 Pink Gods (1922) as Lady Margot Cork
 Hearts Aflame (1923) as Helen Foraker
 The Isle of Lost Ships (1923) as Dorothy Fairfax
 The Rustle of Silk (1923) as Lady Feo
 The Spoilers (1923) as Cherry Malotte
 Hollywood (1923) as Anna Q. Nilsson
 Adam's Rib (1923) as Mrs. Michael Ramsay
 Ponjola (1923) as Lady Flavia Desmond
 Thundering Dawn (1923) as Mary Rogers
 Innocence (1923) as Fay Leslie
 Enemies of Children (1923)
 Half-A-Dollar-Bill (1924) as The Stranger - Mrs. Webber
 Painted People (1924) as Leslie Carter
 Flowing Gold (1924) as Allegheny Briskow
 Between Friends (1924) as Jessica Drene
 Broadway After Dark (1924) as Helen Tremaine
 The Side Show of Life (1924) as Lady Auriol Dayne
 The Fire Patrol (1924) as Mary Ferguson
 The Breath of Scandal (1924)
 Vanity's Price (1924) as Vaana Du Maurier
 Inez from Hollywood (1924) as Inez Laranetta
 Hello, 'Frisco (1924) as herself
 If I Marry Again (1925) as Alicia Wingate
 The Top of the World (1925) as Sylvia Ingleton
 One Way Street (1925) as Lady Sylvia Hutton
 The Talker (1925) as Kate Lennox
 Winds of Chance (1925) as Countess Courteau
 The Splendid Road (1925) as Sandra De Hault
 Too Much Money (1926) as Annabel Broadley
 Her Second Chance (1926) as Mrs. Constance Lee / Caroline Logan
 The Greater Glory (1926) as Fanny
 Miss Nobody (1926) as Barbara Brown
 Midnight Lovers (1926) as Diana Fothergill
 The Masked Woman (1927) as Diane Delatour
 Easy Pickings (1927) as Mary Ryan
 Babe Comes Home (1927) (with Babe Ruth) as Vernie
 Lonesome Ladies (1927) as Polly Fosdick
 The Thirteenth Juror (1927) as Helen Marsden
 Sorrell and Son (1927) as Dora Sorrell
 The Whip (1928) as Iris d'Aquila
 Blockade (1928) as Bess
 The World Changes (1933) as Mrs. Peterson
 School for Girls (1934) as Dr. Anne Galvin
 The Little Minister (1934) as Villager (uncredited)
 Wanderer of the Wasteland (1935) as Mrs. Virey
 Paradise for Three (1938) as First Bridge Player (uncredited)
 Prison Farm (1938) as Matron Ames
 The Trial of Mary Dugan (1941) as Juror (uncredited)
 The People vs. Dr. Kildare (1941) as Juror Next to Foreman (uncredited)
 They Died with Their Boots On (1941) as Mrs. Taipe (uncredited)
 Girls' Town (1942) as Mother Lorraine
 The Great Man's Lady (1942) as Paula Wales (uncredited)
 I Live on Danger (1942) as Mrs. Sherman
 Crossroads (1942) as Madame Deval (uncredited)
 Headin' for God's Country (1943) as Mrs. Nilsson
 Cry 'Havoc' (1943) as Nurse (uncredited)
 The Valley of Decision (1945) as Mrs. Scott's Nurse (uncredited)
 The Sailor Takes a Wife (1945) as Switchboard Operator (uncredited)
 The Secret Heart (1946) as Dr. Rossiger's Secretary (uncredited)
 The Farmer's Daughter (1947) as Mrs. Holstrom
 Cynthia (1947) as Miss Brady
 It Had to Be You (1947) as Saleslady (uncredited)
 Fighting Father Dunne (1948) as Mrs. Olaf Knudson
 The Boy with Green Hair (1948) as Townswoman (uncredited)
 Every Girl Should Be Married (1948) as Saleslady
 In the Good Old Summertime (1949) as Woman with Harp (uncredited)
 Adam's Rib (1949) as Mrs. Poynter (uncredited)
 Malaya (1949) as Secretary (uncredited)
 The Big Hangover (1950) as Helen Lang (uncredited)
 Sunset Boulevard (1950) as herself
 Grounds for Marriage (1951) as Dowager at Friday Club (uncredited)
 Show Boat (1951) as Seamstress (uncredited)
 The Law and the Lady (1951) as Mrs. Scholmm (uncredited)
 An American in Paris (1951) as Kay Jansen (uncredited)
 The Unknown Man (1951) as Cocktail Party Guest (uncredited)
 Fearless Fagan (1952) as Abby's Maid (uncredited)
 The Great Diamond Robbery (1954) as Nurse (uncredited)
 Seven Brides for Seven Brothers (1954) as Mrs. Elcott (uncredited)

References
Notes

Biblikography
Wollstein, Hans J. Strangers in Hollywood: the history of Scandinavian actors in American films from 1910 to World War II (Scarecrow Press. 1994)

Further reading

External links

 
The Pop History Dig
Anna Q. Nilsson at Virtual History

American film actresses
American silent film actresses
Swedish emigrants to the United States
1888 births
1974 deaths
Swedish silent film actresses
20th-century Swedish actresses
Swedish film actresses
People from Ystad Municipality
20th-century American actresses
American Lutherans
Swedish Lutherans
California Republicans
20th-century Lutherans